Edwin Sylvanus Osborne (August 7, 1839 – January 1, 1900) was a Republican member of the U.S. House of Representatives from Pennsylvania.

Biography
Edwin S. Osborne was born in Bethany, Pennsylvania.  He attended the public schools and the University of Northern Pennsylvania at Bethany.  He graduated from the New York State and National Law School at Albany, New York, in 1860.  He was admitted to the bar and practiced law in Wilkes-Barre, Pennsylvania.  He entered the Union Army on August 30, 1862, as captain of Company F, One Hundred and Forty-ninth Regiment, Pennsylvania Volunteer Infantry. He was promoted to major of that regiment on February 25, 1865, and served until honorably discharged on July 25, 1865.

He was appointed by Governor John W. Geary as major general of the National Guard, Third Division, of Pennsylvania in 1870. He served as commander of the Department of Pennsylvania in the Grand Army of the Republic in 1883.

Osborne elected as a Republican to the Forty-ninth, Fiftieth, and Fifty-first Congresses. He was not a candidate for renomination in 1890.  He was a delegate to the 1888 Republican National Convention. He resumed the practice of law in Wilkes-Barre. In 1898 he moved to Washington, D.C.,  and lived in retirement until his death on January 1, 1900. Interment in Arlington National Cemetery.

References
 Retrieved on 2008-02-10
The Political Graveyard

1839 births
1900 deaths
Pennsylvania lawyers
Union Army officers
People from Bethany, Pennsylvania
Burials at Arlington National Cemetery
Republican Party members of the United States House of Representatives from Pennsylvania
19th-century American politicians
Washington, D.C., Republicans
19th-century American lawyers
Military personnel from Pennsylvania